Nicola Campogrande (born 9 October 1969 in Turin) is an Italian composer and music journalist. He is the Artistic Director of the MITO SettembreMusica festival. He writes for the newspaper Corriere della Sera. His music is published exclusively by Breitkopf & Härtel.

Biography
Nicola Campogrande, born in Turin, Italy, in 1969, is regarded as “one of the most interesting italian composers of the young generation” (Amazon.com).

Since 2017 his music is published exclusively by Breitkopf & Härtel.

After graduating from the Conservatories of Milan and Paris, he began to develop an original personal style, combining past and present traditions on a fascinating new path. Performing his scores, such musicians as Gauthier Capuçon, Lilya Zilberstein, Mario Brunello, Roberto Abbado, The Saint Paul Chamber Orchestra, The Orchestre National d’Île-de-France, the Fine Arts Quartet or the Quartetto del Teatro alla Scala have appreciated the freshness and the vitality of his music as well as his ability to touch the heart of the listeners.

A musical theatre enthusiast, he wrote the operas De bello gallico, #Folon, Opera italiana, Macchinario, Lego, Alianti.

He also developed a rich orchestral and chamber catalogue.

Among his most appreciated scores there are the Concerto for audience and orchestra, R (A portrait for piano and orchestra), Nudo, for piano, 150 Decibel, for cello and piano, Urban gardens for piano and chamber orchestra, the Ink-jet preludes for guitar, the Paganini, Paganini!, for violin and piano, the Dances of Launghter and Forgetting for accordion and piano.

His music is recorded on more than 30 cds (from DECCA to independent labels) and it is performed frequently in the most prominent halls of many countries. The Royal Albert Hall and the Wigmore Hall in London, the Teatro alla Scala, the Opéra Royal de Wallonie in Liège, the Werner Hall in Cincinnati, the Philharmonie and the Unesco Auditorium in Paris, the Auditorium Santa Cecilia-Parco della Musica in Rome, the Rudolfinum in Prague, the Auditorio Stelio Molo in Lugano are recent venues.

The artistic director of the MITO SettembreMusica festival, Campogrande is also a host on Italian RAI Radio3 and he produces the TV program Contrappunti on the Classica HD Channel. He writes for the cultural pages of the newspaper Il Corriere della sera.

He has been a member of the International Music Commission of the European Choral Association – Europa Cantat, where he is now Advisor.

His book Occhio alle orecchie. Come ascoltare musica classica e vivere felici (2015) reached six editions and then was published in paperback as well. A second edition has already been made also for the new one 100 brani di musica classica da ascoltare una volta nella vita (2018).

Selected works

Stage
 Il ventre del mare, words by Alessandro Baricco (1994)
 Macchinario, words by Dario Voltolini (1995)
 Capelas imperfeitas, words by Dario Voltolini (1997)
 Cronache animali, on lyrics by Toti Scialoja (1998)
 Quando piovvero cappelli a Milano, words by Gianni Rodari (from Tante storie per giocare) (2000)
 Lego, words by Dario Voltolini (2000)
 Alianti, words by Dario Voltolini (2001)
 Tempi burrascosi, words by Dario Voltolini (2009)
 Opera italiana, words by Elio and Piero Bodrato (2010)
 De bello gallico, su libretto di Piero Bodrato (2016)
 Folon, su libretto di Piero Bodrato (2017)
 La notte di San Nicola, su libretto di Piero Bodrato (2020)

Orchestral (with and without soloists)
 Concerto per pianoforte e orchestra (2002) from the Concerto per cembalo e archi BWV 1052 (Bach)
 Sinfonietta (2004)
 Absolut – Concert for cello, bass and string orchestra (2004)
 Tre piccolissime musiche notturne (2006)
 Alta tensione – for electric violin and string orchestra (2006)
 Soffio blu – Concert for flute and string orchestra (2006)
 Warm trip – Concert for cello and string orchestra (2007)
 Absolut new version – Concert for cello, bass and orchestra (2007)
 Paganini, Paganini!  Concert for violino and orchestra (2011)
 Urban Gardens Concert for piano and orchestra (2012)
 R (un ritratto per pianoforte e orchestra)  Concert for piano and orchestra (2012)
 Banksy Promenade for orchestra (2013)
 Magia nera for orchestra (2013)
The Expo Variations for orchestra (2014-2015)
Concerto for audience and orchestra (2015)
Divertimento (2016)
Le felicità, for soprano, choir and orchestra (2018)
Le sette mogli di Barbablù for actor and orchestra  (2018)
Sinfonia n. 1 (2019-2021)
Cinque modi per aprire un concerto (2021)

Chamber music
 La voce delle nuvole che non-ci sono più for bass clarinet and voice (1992)
 Torino, una sigla for flute, violin and cello (1993)
 Tutto il mondo for violin, cello and piano (1994)
 Macchina per aspettare che sia pronto il the for four instruments (1995)
 Arrivano i nostri for violin, cello and piano (1998)
 Tililadodin for harp and piano (2000)
 Blu tranquillo, for eight instruments (2002)
 Danze del riso e dell'oblio for accordion and piano (2004)
 Esterno di edificio for string quintet (2 violins, viola, cello, double bass) (2005)
 Follie for 2 violins, theorbo, cello and harpsichord (2005)
 Effetto Kreutzer for violin and piano (2007)
 Danze della signorina Olivia for violin and piano (2008)
 Danza delle mele azzurre for bassoon and cello (2009)
 Istruzioni per il cielo for clarinet, viola and piano (2010)
 Rimedi per l'anima string quartet (2011)
150 decibel for cello and piano / viola and piano / 3 pianos  (2015)
Paganini, Paganini!  for violin and piano (2011-2019)
Divertimento for strings (2019)
Forme di felicità for violin and piano (2020)

Choral and vocal music
 Dipingendo for baritone and tea-box (1995)
 La testa del chiodo for boys' chorus, words by Gianni Rodari (1996)
 Hölderlied for soprano and ensemble (1996)
 Canto dell'animale senza nome for voice and piano, words by Dario Voltolini (2000)
 Il mare è un grande latte for boys' chorus, words by Dario Voltolini (2002)
 Agnus Dei for mixed chorus (2011)

Solo instruments
 Modicomò for flute (1993)
 Il Finale, for piano (1994)
 Passa di qui for clarinet (1997)
 Tichitachitac for marimba and hi-hat (1997)
 Preludi a getto d'inchiostro for guitar (2001–2003)
 Bach Werke Variation for piano (2003)
 La dolce Italia for piano (2003)
 Progetto per una notte di stelle for harp (2006)
 Momento musicale for piano (2007)
 Ludwig van Gotlibovich for viola (2011)
Nudo for piano (2015)
 12 Preludi a getto d'inchiostro for 11 Stings Guitar - revision of Christian Lavernier (2018)
Preludi da viaggio for piano (2021)

Exhibitions and incidental music
 Modigliani per la mostra "Modigliani. L'angelo dal volto severo". Milan, Palazzo Reale, 2003
 Africa, capolavori da un continente per la mostra omonima. Turin, Galleria d'arte moderna, 2003–2004
 Il nome della rosa (2005) commissioned by Rai Radio Due, radiophonic version directed by Giuseppe Venetucci
 Giovanna d'Arco (1998) commissioned by Teatro Stabile of Turin
 Antenati (1997) commissioned by Teatro Settimo
 I corvi (1997) commissioned by Rai Radio Tre – "Teatri alla radio" project
 Dal matrimonio al divorzio (1996) commissioned by Teatro Stabile of Turin
 Una pallida felicità (1995) commissioned by Teatro Stabile of Turin

Discography
 La voce delle nuvole che non-ci sono più, DDT (1992)
 Mosorrofa, o dell'ottimismo (su testi di Dario Voltolini), DDT (1993)
 Il finale, DDT (1994)
 Capelas imperfeitas – Diciotto canzoni senza tetto su testi di Dario Voltolini, DDT (1997)
 Cronache animali – Pocket opera per attrice che canta e cinque strumenti su testi di Toti Scialoja, DDT (1998)
 Africa. Capolavori da un continente, DDT (2004)
 Danze del riso e dell'oblio, STRADIVARIUS (2005)
 Tango del vento? e Bossa del vento? in Luz, VELUT LUNA (2005)
 Progetto per una notte di stelle, VELUT LUNA (2006)
 Preludi a getto d'inchiostro, VELUT LUNA (2006)
 Skin, ACME (2007)
 Promenade des petites notes, STRADIVARIUS (2007)
 Melodie per preparare la carta, VELUT LUNA (2007)
 Valzer (original soundtrack), CAM (2007)
 La voce delle nuvole che non-ci sono più, BA (2007)
 Musica per Sebastiano del Piombo, HUKAPAN (2008)
 Musica per Palladio, HUKAPAN (2008)
 Just married, OFT LIVE (2008)
 Tililadodin, DECCA (2008)
 Campogrande in jazz, DDT (2009)
 Danze della signorina Olivia, DDT (2010)
 Tutto il mondo, NUOVA ERA
 Passa di qui, DATUM
 La testa del chiodo, PCT
 Tango, MARRERO
Hauptstimmen, CONTINUO RECORDS (2016)
Nudo, DDT (2020)
Materna, BRILLIANT (2018)
Amore, GENUIN (2019)
Preludi a getto d'inchiostro, DDT (2020)
Preludi a getto d'inchiostro, DA VINCI (2020)

References

External links
 
 http://www.treccani.it/enciclopedia/nicola-campogrande/

1969 births
Italian composers
Italian male composers
Living people
Musicians from Turin
Journalists from Turin